Copshop is a 2021 American action thriller film directed by Joe Carnahan and written by Kurt McLeod and Carnahan, based on a story by McLeod and Mark Williams. The film stars Gerard Butler, Frank Grillo, and Alexis Louder, and is set in a small-town police station that becomes the battleground between a hitman, a novice police officer, and a con artist.

Copshop was released in the United Kingdom on September 10, 2021, by STXfilms, and was released in the United States on September 17, 2021, by Open Road Films. It received generally positive reviews from critics.

Plot

Con artist and fixer Teddy Murretto is on the run in a stolen unmarked police car, which breaks down not far from a Nevada casino. In the midst of a brawl outside the casino, Murretto sucker-punches rookie police officer Valerie Young so that she will jail him and protect him from his pursuers. One of those pursuers, hitman Bob Viddick, gets himself incarcerated in the same small-town jail by pretending to be drunk and crashing a car into the police car Murretto had abandoned, which was being investigated by two state troopers.

Murretto and Viddick are placed in separate cells, initially thwarting Viddick's plan to kill Murretto. However, Viddick has planted a small incendiary device at the station's entrance and when it ignites and the fire alarm goes off, he takes advantage of the confusion. Viddick beats a drunken man sharing his cell and incapacitates the police sergeant, stealing his gun. He is about to kill Murretto when Young interrupts him and returns him to his cell.

Young, determined to find out the truth, finally gets Murretto to explain his story: he was working for a Nevada casino mob boss and tried to buy off the state's attorney general William Fenton. When Fenton didn't cooperate and was brutally killed, it turned out he had recorded his conversations with Murretto. To save his own skin Murretto agreed to work with the FBI, which led the mob boss to send hired killers after him.

While Murretto and Viddick trade threats, a new killer enters the police station—Anthony Lamb, a second hitman hired to kill Murretto. Entering the station with a bouquet of balloons as cover, he quickly murders several police officers. Young discovers the carnage and retreats behind bulletproof glass to the holding cells containing Murretto and Viddick. In a hail of bullets, one of Young's own rounds ricochets and hits her in the abdomen. Corrupt police officer Huber, who has been stealing drugs from the evidence locker and has killed the sergeant during Lamb's shooting spree, reveals his betrayal to Young and joins forces with Lamb as they attempt to break through the wall of the holding cells.

Murretto and Viddick appeal to Young for the keys to their cells. Murretto manages to convince Young to hand him the keys with the promise that he will return with a medical kit for her, to the dismay of Viddick. Young releases him to go after Huber and Lamb. Just as two of Young's fellow officers are shot by Lamb after they catch him and Huber trying to break through the wall, Murretto arrives on the scene and attacks Lamb and Huber. Huber runs but Viddick shows up (having finally convinced Young to release him too), injures Huber by shooting at his legs and tasers him. Huber runs to a steam-filled shower room where Lamb shoots him by mistake while himself being stalked by Murretto.  Viddick appears and then stabs Lamb and offers Murretto the chance to kill Lamb and avenge the death of his ex and son. Murretto instead shoots both Viddick and Lamb. Murretto returns to the battered doors of the holding cells seemingly to check on Young but instead pours gasoline all over the room, intending to light the entire station on fire and leave the scene, revealing his true nature.

Just as Murretto is about to leave he is confronted by Young, who has meanwhile attended to her gunshot wound. She threatens to put him back in his cell, but Murretto kicks a gasoline bottle and shoots it, lighting the place on fire. Young engages in an intense gunfight with Murretto and is finally about to shoot him, when another corrupt cop (Detective Deena Schier, the investigating officer on the Fenton case) arrives and shoots her instead. Deena is promptly shot by Viddick, who had somehow survived being shot earlier, who then also shoots Murretto to complete his contract. Viddick then helps Young to safety outside while advising her to “let it go” and then escapes in a police car.

While being taken away by ambulance, Young gets a radio dispatch about a stolen police vehicle from the station. She leaves the paramedics by the wayside, commandeers the ambulance and drives off in pursuit of Viddick, with both singing along with the same song on their vehicles' radios.

Cast

In addition, the opening actor credits specifically include Ben Hoffman, who served as a Viddick stunt double, and Michael Morales, who served as the stunt coordinator.

Production

Development and casting
In September 2020, it was announced that Gerard Butler and Frank Grillo would star in the action thriller film Copshop, which would be directed by Joe Carnahan. The screenplay was written by Kurt McLeod, based on a story by McLeod and Mark Williams. It is the first produced screenplay for McLeod, who works as a financial advisor in Edmonton, Alberta, Canada. The most recent draft was written by Carnahan. The film was produced by Williams and Tai Duncan through Zero Gravity Management, Warren Goz and Eric Gold through Sculptor Media, Butler and Alan Siegel through their company G-BASE Productions, and Carnahan and Grillo through their company WarParty Films.

In October 2020, Alexis Louder was cast in the third starring role. Later that month, Ryan O'Nan, Kaiwi Lyman-Mersereau and Toby Huss were cast in supporting roles.

Filming
Principal photography began in October 2020 at Blackhall Studios in Atlanta, Georgia. Filming also took place in Albuquerque, New Mexico. On October 2, filming was shut down after three crew members tested positive for COVID-19 in the midst of the ongoing pandemic. Filming had resumed by October 5, and had wrapped by November 20.

According to Frank Grillo, director Joe Carnahan's cut of the film was rejected in favor of a different cut which did not include as much of his performance.

Release
Copshop was released in the United Kingdom and Ireland on September 10, 2021, by STXfilms and was released in the United States on September 17, 2021, by Open Road Films.

Home media
The film released digitally on November 23, 2021 and on Blu-ray and DVD in December 7, 2021. Netflix released the film on January 15, 2022 in multiple regions.

Reception

Box office
Copshop grossed $5.2 million in the United States and Canada, and $1.5 million in other territories, for a worldwide total of $6.7 million.

In the United States and Canada, Copshop was released alongside Cry Macho, and was projected to gross around $5 million from 3,005 theaters in opening weekend. The film made $950,000 on its first day and went on to debut to $2.3 million, finishing sixth at the box office. It was the second-worst opening of all-time by a film playing in over 3,000 theaters. The film dropped 45% to $1.3 million in its second weekend, finishing eighth.

Critical response
On Rotten Tomatoes the film has an approval rating of 82% based on 109 reviews, with an average rating of 6.50/10. The website's critics consensus reads: "It doesn't add many new ingredients to the genre, but action fans in the mood for an old-school thriller will be happy to buy what Copshop is selling." On Metacritic it has a weighted average score of 61 out of 100 based on reviews from 22 critics, indicating "generally favorable reviews". Audiences surveyed by PostTrak gave the film a 62% positive score, with 39% saying they would definitely recommend it.

Ian Freer of Empire magazine called it "A simple, effective thriller, Copshop doubles down on pulpy, '70s-styled fun. It proffers little that is novel but has enough vim and vigour to compensate."

References

External links
 
 

2021 action thriller films
2020s police films
American action comedy films
American action thriller films
American police films
Film productions suspended due to the COVID-19 pandemic
Films about con artists
Films about contract killing in the United States
Films directed by Joe Carnahan
Films produced by Joe Carnahan
Films scored by Clinton Shorter
Films set in Nevada
Films shot in Atlanta
Films shot in New Mexico
Films with screenplays by Joe Carnahan
Open Road Films films
2020s English-language films
2020s American films